Kompania Piwowarska is a Polish brewing group based in Poznań, established in 1999. Since 2017 it has been owned by Asahi Breweries. Kompania Piwowarska currently has three breweries: Lech Browary Wielkopolski in Poznań, Tyskie Browary Książęce in Tychy and Browar Dojlidy in Białystok. Tyskie Browary Książęce (Princely Brewery Tychy), one of the oldest breweries in Europe, was founded in 1629.

The three breweries have a total capacity of 15.1 million hectolitres.

The company was owned by SABMiller from 2009 to 2017. As part of the agreements made with regulators before Anheuser-Busch InBev was allowed to acquire SABMiller in 2016, it was announced on December 13, 2016, that Kompania Piwowarska would be sold to Asahi Breweries of Japan.

Major brands 
Kompania Piwowarska currently controls 45% of the Polish beer market.

Lech

The main Lech brands are Lech Premium a 5.0% abv pale lager, Lech Pils 5.5% pale lager Lech controls 8% of the Polish beer market.
The Poznań brewery brews Dębowe Mocne (Oak Strong), which is 7%.
Currently produced types are "Lech Premium", "Lech Pils"

Tyskie

Tyskie is one of the best selling brands of beer in Poland, with around 18% of the Polish market. Tyskie also has a world distribution. The main brands are Tyskie Gronie, a 5.0% pale lager,

Dojlidy

The main Dojlidy Brewery brand is the 6% pale lager, Żubr (European bison).

Brands produced in Poland

References

External links 
 Kompania Piwowarska SA website (www.kp.pl)

Breweries of Poland
Companies based in Poznań
Tychy
Białystok
SABMiller
Asahi Breweries
1999 establishments in Poland